Dixie is an unincorporated community in Obion County, Tennessee, United States.

The community was once home to Dixie High School, which is now a GNIS historical landmark.

References

Unincorporated communities in Obion County, Tennessee
Unincorporated communities in Tennessee